The 2004-05 AFC Bournemouth season was the club's second consecutive season in Football League One. During the 2004–05 English football season, Bournemouth participated in League One, the LDV Vans Trophy, the FA Cup, and the Football League Cup. Bournemouth were eliminated from the FA Cup in the Fourth Round, the LDV Vans Trophy in the First Round and the League Cup in the Third Round.

Season squad

Left club during season

Competitions

Football League One

League table

Results

League Cup

FA Cup

Football League Trophy

References 

A.F.C. Bournemouth
AFC Bournemouth seasons
English football clubs 2004–05 season